Loess Bluffs National Wildlife Refuge (renamed in January 2017 from Squaw Creek National Wildlife Refuge) is a National Wildlife Refuge in northwestern Missouri, United States, established in 1935 by President Franklin D. Roosevelt as a refuge and breeding ground for migratory birds and other wildlife.

The refuge comprises  along the eastern edge of the Missouri River floodplain south of Mound City, Missouri in Holt County, Missouri.

The refuge is bounded by the Loess Hills on the east with a trail going to the top built originally by the Civilian Conservation Corps.  The most dramatic moments occur during spring and fall migrations, when the refuge serves as a chokepoint for hundreds of thousands of ducks and geese (particularly snow geese) on the Central Flyway.  As many as 475 bald eagles have been sighted on the refuge in the winter.  The refuge annually celebrates the eagle visits with "Eagle Days" celebrations.  In February 2013, over one million snow geese were counted.

The creek is the larger of the two main creeks that feed the refuge and parallels the road on the west. Davis Creek, the next biggest creek, parallels the east side road. They merge with the Little Tarkio Creek just south of the refuge in a man made ditch leading five miles (8 km) to the Missouri River.

History
The land which was originally wetlands used by migratory foul had earlier been used as a private hunting preserve.

In 1906 the Squaw Creek Drainage District No. 1 after much litigation using the contactors Rogers & Rogers completed ditches to drain nearly 20,000 acres of land into the Missouri River in a massive project in which more than 500,000 cubic yards of earth were moved (335,031 on Squaw Creek and 192,715 on Davis Creek) in area stretching from East Rulo to Mound City at a point where the Missouri River bottoms were said to be the widest of its entire length.  The Holt County Sentinel celebrated the completion with the headline "Rolls on to the Sea...Twenty Thousand Acres of Land Reclaimed and Will Here After Blossom as the Rose."  The article said that people from Kansas City would have to find some place to hunt.

The draining of the land did little to prevent the flat area on the Missouri River bottoms from flooding from the streams that emptied into the area.  In 1908 two years after its completion the land was flooded.  In 1915 in a flood that was said to be worse than the Great Flood of 1881 which had been an incentive for draining the land indundated much of land.

On August 23, 1935 Executive Order 7156 by President Franklin D. Roosevelt called for a reversal of the project to create a "refuge feeding and breeding ground for migratory birds and other wildlife." It was the first national wildlife refuge in Missouri.  Its original planned name was the "Squaw Creek Migratory Water Fowl Refuge." The original plan called for it to be 8,135 acres but the government was unable to acquire all the land and it was reduced to 7,415 acres.  The plan allowed for management of the runoff from the local creeks with various pools.  The Civilian Conservation Corps was tasked with restoring the wetland state.

The basic ditch drainage system still remains with Squaw Creek and Davis Creek combined with water from a channeled Tarkio Creek draining almost due south from the refuge into the Missouri.

A  trail built by the Civilian Conservation Corps climbs  vertically to a refuge overlook from which you can see Missouri, Kansas, and Nebraska.

A one-way  gravel road (the "Wild Goose Tour Loup") travels around the edge of the refuge.  The refuge reports that 134,245 visited in 2001 with 41,683 at the headquarters.

Renaming
In December 2016 Daniel M. Ashe, director of the U.S. Fish and Wildlife Service, said he was going to rename the refuge to Eagle Flats by the second week of January 2017 before the Barack Obama administration left office.  Authorities noted that the Fish and Wildlife Service has the authority to change names without public input.  Another name that was floated after the announcement was Loess Mounds.

On January 11, 2017 the refuge was officially renamed Loess Bluffs National Wildlife Refuge. The announcement stated that the creek is still an important part of the refuge and history, but that the word "squaw" is no longer an acceptable name in the National Wildlife Refuge System.

There have been rumblings about use of the Squaw name for years.  The Iowa tribe who operate the Casino White Cloud on a reservation in neighboring White Cloud, Kansas in 2004 re-opened the Squaw Creek Truck Plaza, which was a landmark at the refuge exit on Interstate 29 that had been shuttered for several years.

References

External links

 Official website

National Wildlife Refuges in Missouri
Protected areas of Holt County, Missouri
Civilian Conservation Corps in Missouri
Wetlands of Missouri
Landforms of Holt County, Missouri